SiRFstarIII is a range of high sensitivity GPS microcontroller chips manufactured by SiRF Technology. GPS microcontroller chips interpret signals from GPS satellites and determine the position of the GPS receiver. It was announced in 2004.

Features 
SiRFstarIII features:
 A 20-channel receiver, which can process the signals of all visible GPS and WAAS satellites simultaneously.
 Power consumption of 62 mW during continuous operation.
 Assisted GPS client capability can reduce TTFF to less than one second.
 Receiver sensitivity of -159 dBm while tracking.
 SBAS (WAAS, MSAS, EGNOS) support

References

External links 
 SiRFstarIII product web page
 SiRFstarIII OpenStreetMap

Microcontrollers
Global Positioning System